The Oaks is a historic plantation house located near Winnsboro, Fairfield County, South Carolina in the Piedmont region.  It was built in 1835 by Richard Hallum, and is a large, two-story, weatherboarded frame residence with a gable-end roof. The front façade features a central, two-tiered pedimented portico supported by four simple wooden columns. From 1856 the property was owned by John Montgomery Lemmon and his descendants. Considered a moderately wealthy planter, in 1860 he owned 19 slaves and his entire plantation was worth $10,000.

This area was developed for cultivation of short-staple cotton in the 19th century, after the invention of the cotton gin, which made processing this type of cotton profitable. The antebellum residence was identified as notable by the state of South Carolina in 1983 and it was listed on the National Register of Historic Places in 1984.

References

Plantation houses in South Carolina
Houses on the National Register of Historic Places in South Carolina
Houses completed in 1850
Houses in Fairfield County, South Carolina
National Register of Historic Places in Fairfield County, South Carolina